Karthikappally is a village in Alappuzha district in the Indian state of Kerala.Haripad is the headquarter of Karthikappally Taluk. Taluk office is located at revenue tower Haripad.

History
Karthikappally was once a Buddhist center. Since in the year 904-933 the Great ruler of Travancore, King Marthanda Varma, added Karthikappally to Travancore. In 1742 and 1753 the nearby places namely, Kayamkulam and Ambalapuzha was added to the Karthikappally Natturajyam, making it a prominent region since then. The area between the now existing Purakkad and Kayamkulam was the once Karthikappally.

What made Karthikappally the most unusual and important was the proximity of an inland waterway or a Thodu which enabled free flow of traffic and evolved Karthikappally into a Trading center. The market was huge and crowded, still remains of the old market stays.

Many years after its glorious past, the Karthikappally Panchayat was formed. Shri. K Damodaran was its first man in place. In 1912, the Govt. School in Mahadevikadu was constructed followed by The Govt. L P School in memory of Divan Krishnan Nair. Many great Leaders had their footprints on the sands of time of Karthikappally.

This included the only Minister from Karthikappally and MLA Shri. A Achutan, Achutan Vakeel, A V Anandarajan, Kanikara Madhava Kurup, Krishnankutty Sir, Putathu Narayan were all the lost heroes who fought for the freedom of the country.

Many Iconic landmarks were constructed in Karthikappally, which stands as testimonials to the great heritage of this place. Pithampil sree dharma sastha Temple, Pithampil Kottaram, The St. Thomas Orthodox Cathedral or the Kottakakatthu Suriyani Palli, Mar Thoma Church, St Mary's Catholic Church, Karumbali Koikkal Kottaram, Karthikappally Kottaram, Valiyakulangara Devi Temple, Kottaram Mudiyil Shri KrishnaSwami Kshetram, VathaloorKolical Kshetram, The Haripad Sree Subrahmanya Swamy Temple or Kshetram and the centuries-old mosques in Karthikappally are also famous. The Ananthapuram Kottaram is also famous in many ways adding to the proud history of this place. the world-famous Mannarasala Temple also yet another mark of history.

Villages of Karthikappally Taluk
1. Arattupuzha
2. Cheppad
3. Cheruthana
4. Chingoli
5. Haripad
6. Kandallor
7. Karthikappally
8. Karuvatta
9. Kayamkulam
10. Keerikkad
11. Krishnapuram
12. Kumarapuram
13. Muthukulam
14. Pallippad
15. Pathiyoor
16. Puthuppally
17. Thrikkunnapuzha
18.Veeyapuram

Places
Haripad is the headquarters of Karthikappally taluk. Haripad municipality and Kayamkulam municipality comes under Karthikappally Taluk.Haripad Sree Subrahmanya Swamy Temple and Mannarasala Temple are the famous pilgrimage sites near the village. Pandy is an island in karthikapally taluk.
Karthikapally
St Thomas Orthodox Church (Kottakkakathu Old Syrian Church AD-829). is situated at the Karthikappally junction on the way to Thrikunappuzha. It is estimated that the church is more than 1200 years old. The exact year of construction is unknown. There are above 600 families in the parish.

Karthikappally St. Thomas Orthodox Cathedral is one of the ancient churches in Kerala. The church, established some thousand years before, is at Harippad. Karthikappally church keeps an immense archive of the local history in about 621palmyra-written records.
The church became the centre of attraction recently as two lithograph records and the remnants suspected to be that of a metropolitan were unearthed from the church premises. The lithographic stones have been identified to be 300 years old.

Cheppad is about 44 km north of Kollam on Kollam-Alappuzha National Highway 47. It has an Orthodox Syrian Christian Church dedicated to St. George built in 1300 AD, a place of pilgrimage for Orthodox Syrian Christians. The main portico and subsidiary porches are built after the traditional pattern of the porches of Hindu temple. The wood carvings in the porches and the mural paintings which depicts the great scenes of epic of Jesus Christ are unique and rare specimens. Mar Dionysius IV  of the Malankara Orthodox Syrian Church (often called the Cheppad Metropolitan) is buried there. In 1956 Hailie Salassie, the Emperor of Ethiopia visited the church.

The wooden sculptures in the gopuram of Vettikkulangara Bhagavathy temple are famous.

Demographics
 India census, Karthikappally had a population of 19064 with 9107 males and 9957 females.

Education 

St Thomas High School(1919) one of the Oldest in the area which opened as a high school which is affiliated to Kerala State Education Board.

Karthikappally has its fair share of privately owned and state owned educational institutions. Institutions of education are affiliated to either the Central Board for Secondary Education (CBSE), or the Kerala State Education Board.

Most private schools use English language as the medium of instruction whereas government run schools offer both English and Malayalam as a medium of instruction.

References

Villages in Alappuzha district